NATS Holdings, formerly National Air Traffic Services and commonly referred to as NATS, provides en-route air traffic control services to flights within the UK flight information regions and the Shanwick Oceanic Control Area. It also provides air traffic control services to 14 UK airports.

The company's en-route business is regulated and operated under licence from the Civil Aviation Authority (CAA).

Predecessors

NATCS
The organisation was originally set up as the National Air Traffic Control Services (NATCS) in 1962, bringing together responsibility for the UK's existing military and civil air traffic control services.

NATS
The organisation became National Air Traffic Services when responsibility for sponsoring the civil air traffic service component was transferred to the newly formed Civil Aviation Authority (CAA) in 1972. Prior to this it had no legal existence – all contracts were with the CAA or MoD.

Management
Until its establishment as a separate company, the leadership of NATS (the 'Controller') alternated between civil and military, the latter normally a serving air marshal. The first controller was Sir Laurence Sinclair, exceptionally an air vice marshal. NATS staff were drawn from and paid by, the CAA and the MoD.

Restructuring
In 1992 it was recognised that as a service provider, NATS should be operated at some distance from its regulator, the CAA. Although debated, it was decided that NATS should not be privatised at that time. NATS was re-organised into a limited company on 1 April 1996 and became a wholly owned subsidiary of the CAA. The direct involvement of military officers in the management of NATS ended at this time, although the last military Controller, Air Marshal Sir Thomas Stonor, KCB, had retired in 1991.

Structure

The workforce of NATS includes air traffic controllers (ATCOs), air traffic control engineers (ATCEs), air traffic services assistants (ATSAs) and science technical analytical and research staff (STARs). Administrative and support staff make up the remainder of the 4,200 or so employees of NATS. Martin Rolfe became CEO of NATS in May 2015.

NATS is split into two main service provision companies: NATS En-Route PLC (NERL) and NATS Services Ltd (NSL).

 NERL is the sole provider of civilian en-route air traffic control over the UK and is regulated by the CAA which, for example, determines the charges NERL can make. NERL is funded by Eurocontrol route charges for the provision of air traffic services.
 NSL competes for contracts to provide air traffic control at airports in the UK and overseas, as well as providing related services including engineering, consultancy, information services, and training.

Ownership
In 1998, a public-private partnership was proposed. This was written into the Transport Act 2000 and in 2001 51% of NATS was transferred to the private sector. However, due to the decline in air traffic following the September 11, 2001 attacks £130m of additional investment was required, £65m coming each from the UK government and BAA, which received 4% of the company in return.

As a public-private partnership the UK government holds 49% and a golden share, with 42% held by the Airline Group, 5% by NATS staff, and 4% by UK airport operator LHR Airports Ltd.

Operations
In 2019 NATS handled 2.54m flights.

En-route control centres
There are two control locations in the UK operated by NERL:

 London Area Control Centre and London Terminal Control Centre at Swanwick in Hampshire control both upper level en-route traffic across England and Wales up to the Scottish border and low-level traffic around London and South East England, including aircraft making approaches to the main London airports.
 The Prestwick Centre, Ayrshire, is home to the Scottish Area Control Centre (including, since January 2010, the former Manchester Area Control Centre), which controls traffic over Scotland, Northern Ireland, and up to FL285 over the northern half of England, and the Prestwick Oceanic Area Control Centre which provides a procedural control service for traffic crossing the North Atlantic via the Shanwick Oceanic Control Area.

Various radar stations are operated around the UK, one such being that on Great Dun Fell in Cumbria.

Defunct

The London Air Traffic Control Centre at RAF West Drayton opened in 1966 and provided ATC services until it closed in 2007, with the move to Swanwick.

Scottish air traffic control has been carried out from Atlantic House in Prestwick since 1978. This situation changed with the opening of the Prestwick Centre in 2010, to which all operational services were transferred from the old Atlantic House along with the functions carried out at the Manchester Area Control Centre which subsequently closed.

Airport services

The airports service line provides air traffic services at 13 UK airports plus Gibraltar:

 London Heathrow Airport
 Southampton Airport
 Aberdeen Airport
 London City Airport
 London Luton Airport
 London Stansted Airport
 Cardiff Airport
 Bristol Airport
 Farnborough Airport
 Gibraltar Airport
 Manchester Airport
 Belfast International Airport
 Belfast City Airport
 Glasgow Airport 

NATS has also won contracts to provide air traffic control engineering services at certain airports including:
 London Biggin Hill Airport
 London Oxford Airport
 Highlands and Islands Airports

NATS also provides services to the Ministry of Defence (MoD), via Qinetiq, for air traffic and range air control services at a number of UK ranges, including:
 Aberporth
 Hebrides (Deep Sea Range)
 Larkhill
 West Freugh

NATS also provides services to the MoD's Military Aviation Authority.

Aberdeen NSL provides air traffic services on behalf of NERL to offshore helicopters operating primarily from Aberdeen, Shetland (Sumburgh), Humberside Airport, Norwich Airport and North Denes.

FerroNATS

NATS, through its airports service line, established an alliance with Spanish partner Ferrovial in 2011, forming ferroNATS, which provides air traffic control (ATC) services at nine airports across Spain: Alicante, Valencia, Ibiza, Sabadell, Sevilla, Jerez, Melilla, Madrid Cuatro Vientos, Vigo and A Coruña airports in Spain. FerroNATS was awarded the contract to provide services at these airports through a competitive tender process run by the Spanish aviation authority, AENA.  All nine operational handovers were completed between November 2012 and January 2014.

Defence

NATS helps the military around the world share airspace with civil aviation for commercial, political and environmental reasons. Services NATS provides include:

 Aeronautical data
 Defence consulting
 En route
 Military Terminal ATC provision
 Surveillance

Aquila

Aquila is a joint venture between NATS and Thales responsible for delivering the UK's Marshall program to transform terminal air traffic management at military airfields.  Marshall seeks to ensure a safe, efficient and sustainable air traffic management (ATM) service for the UK armed forces. It will modernise ATM at over 100 MoD locations, in the UK and overseas, including more than 60 airfields and ranges.

Aquila is tasked to deliver a system-wide modernisation and rationalisation of the current fragmented system, and establish a flexible ATM service which is future-proofed to meet potential changes in the regulatory and technological landscape.

Engineering

NATS ensures that engineering customers' technology and infrastructure projects are transitioned with the operational context in mind. Engineering services NATS provides include:

 Control centre systems
 Airport technology

Consultancy

NATS enables the ATC community to find innovative ways to solve specific operational and technical challenges as well as providing air traffic control services. These include:

 Airspace design
 Capacity planning
 Environmental reporting
 Occupational Health 
 Runway capacity studies
 Strategy and business planning
 Safety management and human factors
 Technology and projects

Information services

Services provided by NATS include:

 Aeronautical charting
 Aeronautical Information Management (AIM)
 Procedure design
 Surveillance data
 Target Start Approval Time (TSAT)
 Wind farms planning and consultancy

Associations and alliances with other organisations 

NATS is a full member of the SESAR (the Single European Sky ATM Research program) Joint Undertaking and a member of the SESAR Deployment Alliance, a cross-industry partnership made up of four airline groups, operators of 25 airports and 11 air traffic control providers. The SESAR Deployment Alliance was appointed to the role of SESAR Deployment Manager by the European Commission in December 2014 and will help to co-ordinate and synchronise the modernisation of Europe's air traffic management system.

NATS is a founding member of two of Europe's leading ANSP Alliances – the A6 Alliance and the Borealis Alliance.

The A6 is an alliance of some of the main European Air Navigation Service Providers (ANSPs). Its aim is to help drive modernisation of the European ATM network within the SESAR programme for the benefit of customers. The A6 members are full members of the SESAR Joint Undertaking and are part of the SESAR Deployment Alliance, which was recently appointed SESAR Deployment Manager by the European Commission.

The Borealis Alliance is a leading Alliance of Air Navigation Service Providers (ANSPs) that enables its Members to drive better performance for stakeholders through business collaboration. The Alliance includes the ANSPs of Denmark, Estonia, Finland, Iceland, Ireland, Latvia, Norway, Sweden and the UK. The Borealis Alliance is currently working on a major programme to deliver free route airspace across the whole of Northern Europe by 2020.

Since the 1940s, the Irish and UK air traffic control service providers have worked effectively together. This was further strengthened in July 2008 when the UK and Ireland launched the first operational Functional Airspace Block, often referred to in the industry as FAB, under the European Commission's Single European Sky initiative.

NATS is a full member of CANSO. It is a shareholder in European Satellite Services Provider (ESSP), a company set up to operate EGNOS.

NATS is primarily known for the air traffic services it provides in the UK but also works internationally providing air traffic and consultancy services in over 30 countries, working with many different organisations in Europe and beyond, including Singapore, the United States and Qatar.

Notable incidents
From the 15th to 20 April 2010, under internationally agreed guidelines that require a zero tolerance approach to ash, NATS placed a series of restrictions on aircraft operating in UK controlled airspace owing to the potential dangers caused by a volcanic ash cloud from the eruption of Icelandic volcano Eyjafjallajökull, in cooperation with the Met Office, CAA and UK government.

On 12 December 2014, from 15:30 until 16:30, traffic flow throughout the London airspace was restricted due to a computer system failure at NATS. At 15:30 an announcement was made by Eurocontrol that "There has been a failure of the flight data computer server at London ACC [area control centre]." At 16:30 the airspace was reopened, however it remained restricted with some landing flights being turned away. NATS reported that the failure was due to a single faulty line of software source code.

See also
 History of air traffic control in the United Kingdom

 Linesman/Mediator

References

External links 

 
 Our control centres , NATS

Video clips
 Britain from above
 UK 24
 Yuletide 24

Business services companies established in 1962
Air traffic control in the United Kingdom
Air traffic controller schools
Government-owned companies of the United Kingdom
Department for Transport
Service companies of the United Kingdom
Organisations based in Hampshire
Companies based in Hampshire
1962 establishments in the United Kingdom
Air navigation service providers